Stig Johansen (born 13 June 1972 in Kabelvåg, Lofoten) is a former Norwegian football striker.

He made his debut for Bodø/Glimt in 1993 and played 70 games before he was signed by English Premiership side Southampton, in 1997. His spell at the English side was spent mostly in the reserves and rarely played for the Saints. He also spent a period on loan at Bristol City, before being transferred to Swedish side Helsingborgs IF. In 2002, he returned to Bodø/Glimt. He has won three caps for Norway.

He announced his retirement in October 2009., but made a comeback in 2011 after being given a one-year contract with Bodø/Glimt.

On 31 August 2014 Johansen made comeback for his home club Kabelvåg, he just played one game to finish his career for good. He also open the new pitch for Kabelvåg.

Career statistics

References

External links

1972 births
Living people
People from Vågan
Norwegian footballers
Norway international footballers
FK Bodø/Glimt players
Southampton F.C. players
English Football League players
Premier League players
Bristol City F.C. players
Helsingborgs IF players
Allsvenskan players
Eliteserien players
Norwegian First Division players
Norwegian expatriate footballers
Expatriate footballers in England
Expatriate footballers in Sweden
Norwegian expatriate sportspeople in England
Norwegian expatriate sportspeople in Sweden
Association football forwards
Sportspeople from Nordland